Jouko Matti Leppä (born 16 April 1943) is a retired Finnish super-heavyweight weightlifter. He competed at the 1972, 1976 and 1980 Summer Olympics, and at every world championship between 1975 and 1980. His best result was fourth place at the 1972 Games.

References

External links
 

1943 births
Living people
Finnish male weightlifters
Olympic weightlifters of Finland
Weightlifters at the 1972 Summer Olympics
Weightlifters at the 1976 Summer Olympics
Weightlifters at the 1980 Summer Olympics
People from Heinola
Sportspeople from Päijät-Häme
20th-century Finnish people